Cai Zhuohua is a Beijing minister active in the Chinese house church movement. He was arrested on 11 September 2004 for printing bibles without a permit.  Cai was sentenced to imprisonment for three years after a trial at the Beijing Intermediate People's Court. Prior to his arrest more than 200,000 bibles had been found.

References

External links
Beijing House Church Leader Trial Date Set

Chinese Protestant ministers and clergy
Chinese prisoners and detainees
Year of birth missing (living people)
Living people